is a passenger railway station in the town of Higashiagatsuma, Gunma Prefecture, Japan, operated by East Japan Railway Company (JR East).

Lines
Gunma-Haramachi Station is a station on the Agatsuma Line, and is located 22.9 rail kilometers from the terminus of the line at Shibukawa Station.

Station layout
The station consists of a single side platform serving bi-directional traffic.

History
Gunma-Haramachi Station was opened on 5 August 1945. The station was absorbed into the JR East network upon the privatization of the Japanese National Railways (JNR) on 1 April 1987. A new station building was completed in February 2002.

Passenger statistics
In fiscal 2015, the station was used by an average of 488  passengers daily (boarding passengers only).

Surrounding area
Higashiagatsuma Town Hall
Haramachi Post Office
Nurukawa Onsen

See also
 List of railway stations in Japan

References

External links

 JR East Station information 

Railway stations in Gunma Prefecture
Agatsuma Line
Stations of East Japan Railway Company
Railway stations in Japan opened in 1945
Higashiagatsuma, Gunma